Balingup is a town in the South West of Western Australia,  south of the state capital, Perth, and  southeast of the town of Donnybrook.

The town takes its name from Balingup Pool, located on the Balingup Brook which flows through the town. The name was first recorded by a surveyor in 1850, and is said to be derived from the name of Noongar warrior, Balingan. Other research by Noongar academic and researcher Len Collard has shown the name derives from the language, meaning "one that is situated there at this place".

The town is on the South Western Highway. It originally had a station on the Northcliffe Branch railway, opened in 1898, the same year the town was gazetted.

Balingup was known in the twentieth century for fruit and vegetable growing, and more recently for beef cattle and organic produce.  There are two long-established religious communities.

Balingup hosts annual rural festivals, primarily the Small Farm Field Day (late April) and Medieval Carnivale (August).

Nearby are found mushroom varieties of interest to both drug users and law enforcement agencies. A large mushroom statue pays homage to the regions association with fungi and can be found on the Balingup Nannup road near the old cheese factory.

Balingup is also one of the few towns through which the Bibbulmun Track passes.

A bushfire swept through the area in 2013, reducing the Southampton homestead to ruins.

Notes

Further reading
 Frost, A. C. Baylya-Balinga : a History of Balingup, W.A. Donnybrook, W.A. : Donnybrook-Balingup Shire Council, 1979. 

Towns in Western Australia
South West (Western Australia)